The Zetland is the oldest surviving lifeboat in the world. It is currently in a free museum in Redcar, England. The name Zetland comes from the local Lord of Manor, the Marquess of Zetland. The Zetland is on the National Register of Historic Ships, as part of the National Historic Fleet.

The lifeboat was stationed at Redcar in 1802, built by Henry Greathead of South Shields.

Not all rescue attempts were successful. On Christmas Day 1836, a crewman was washed from the Zetland and drowned during a vain attempt to save the crew of the Danish brig Caroline. The man, William Guy, was a Tees pilot, and it is said that he left a service in chapel to take his place in the lifeboat.

During 1858 the Tees Bay Lifeboat Society decided to hand over the administration of their boats to the RNLI. On 17 February 1864, the Zetland sustained damage whilst rescuing the crew of seven from the brig Brothers. The RNLI considered the old boat no longer fit for service and supplied a new self-righting lifeboat named Crossley. Arrangements were made to have the Zetland broken up and a local carpenter was employed to carry out the task. An angry crowd prevented the work commencing and, after negotiation, the boat was given to the townspeople providing it would not 'compete' with the new RNLI lifeboat.

In 1872, the Zetland was repaired following fundraising which totalled £100. In 1880, it was launched with two other Redcar lifeboats (the Crossley and the Emma) and saved seven sailors' lives from the brig Luna.

The boat was the centrepiece of 1963 International Lifeboat Conference in Edinburgh. Listed as part of the National Historic Fleet, the Zetland lifeboat remains fully preserved and open for public visits in the Zetland Lifeboat Museum, which is a listed building on the Esplanade, Redcar, just a few hundred yards from the present Redcar Lifeboat Station.

References

Further reading

External links 
 Zetland Lifeboat Museum

Greathead-class lifeboats
Museum ships in the United Kingdom
Sea rescue in England
Ships and vessels of the National Historic Fleet
Redcar
Ships built on the River Tyne